A bronze statue of William III of England stands on the south side of Kensington Palace in London, facing towards the Golden Gates. It was cast by the Gladenbeck foundry in Berlin and given as a gift by the German Emperor Wilhelm II to his uncle, King Edward VII. The statue has been a Grade II listed building since 1969.

The statue was created as one of five large statues of the Princes of Orange – the  – commissioned by Wilhelm II and erected in 1907 on the balustrade of the terrace on the north side of the Berliner Schloss, beside the Lustgarten in Berlin. The statues were intended to illustrate the close relationship between the Dutch House of Orange and the German House of Hohenzollern, and they echo similar statues by François Dieussart erected by Frederick William, Elector of Brandenburg, in the pleasure garden of the City Palace, Potsdam. Copies of each statue were also commissioned and presented as gifts: the originals were damaged in the Second World War and four were destroyed. (The statue of Maurice of Orange by Martin Wolff survived, and was displayed beside Humboldt Box.) Most of the copies have survived, including the statue in London.

He wears 17th-century military dress, including an ornate feathered hat, sword and cuirass, and high leather boots. The figure stands on a  Portland stone pedestal which was designed by Aston Webb, who would later create the Victoria Memorial in London. 

The front of the pedestal bears the inscription:

A popular story states that the design of the character Captain Hook was inspired by the statue.

See also 
 Grade II listed buildings in London
 List of public art in Kensington Gardens
 List of statues of English and British royalty in London

References

External links 
 
 
  William III statue – W8, londonremembers.com
 William III c. 1906–7, Royal Collection Trust
 Die Standbilder der Oranierfürsten der Lustgartenseite, berliner-schloss.de
 Sculpture in the borough, Royal Borough of Kensington and Chelsea

1907 sculptures
Bronze sculptures in London
Statue of William III
Grade II listed statues in London
Statue of William III
Royal monuments in the United Kingdom
Statues of William III of England